Wilhelm Winter (born 1968) is a German mathematician, specializing in operator algebras (and particularly C*-algebras).

Education and career
Winter received in 1996 his Diplom from the Heidelberg University and in 2000 his doctorate (Promotion) from the University of Münster with thesis advisor Joachim Cuntz and thesis Covering Dimension for Nuclear C*-Algebras. At the University of Münster he was a research assistant from 2001 to 2007 and habilitated there in 2006 in Münster. In Fall 2002 he was a visiting assistant professor at Texas A & M University. From 2007 to 2011 he was at University of Nottingham, first as a lecturer and later as a reader. Winter is a professor of mathematics at the University of Münster since 2011.

In 2010 he received with Andrew Toms the G. de B. Robinson Award. In 2018 Winter was an invited speaker  with talk Structure of nuclear C*-algebras: From quasidiagonality to classification, and back again at the International Congress of Mathematicians in Rio de Janeiro.

Selected publications

References

External links
 Wilhelm Winter on the website of the University of Münster
 arxiv.org preprints by Wilhelm Winter

20th-century German mathematicians
21st-century German mathematicians
Heidelberg University alumni
University of Münster alumni
Academic staff of the University of Münster
1968 births
Living people